Atef Mohamed Naguib Sedky (29 August 1930 – 25 February 2005) was the Prime Minister of Egypt from 1986 until 1996. He replaced Aly Mahmoud Lotfy on November 10, 1986.

Biography
Sedky was born in the Nile Delta city of Tanta. He was a lawyer and economist by training, receiving a doctorate in economics from the University of Paris in France. Before becoming Prime Minister, he was the director of the Egyptian Central Auditing Organization. In 2004, Sedky fractured his thigh. He died on 25 February 2005 at a Cairo hospital. Sedky and his German-born wife, Ursula, had two children Ahmed and Sherif.

Political career
As prime minister, Sedky supervised and sometimes criticised reforms suggested by the International Monetary Fund. In November 1993, he survived an assassination attempt in Cairo by the militant Islamic group Vanguards of Conquest, which resulted in the death of a schoolgirl called Shaimaa. On 2 January 1996, he along with his cabinet resigned; his post was filled two days later by Kamal Ganzouri. Sedky is the longest serving Egyptian prime minister since the Khedivate in 1878.

Death
Sedky died on 25 February 2005.

References

External links

1930 births
2005 deaths
20th-century prime ministers of Egypt
University of Paris alumni
National Democratic Party (Egypt) politicians
People from Tanta